Asmea is a genus of Papuan sheetweb spiders that was first described by M. R. Gray & H. M. Smith in 2008.

Species
 it contains four species, all found in Papua New Guinea:
Asmea akrikensis Gray & Smith, 2008 (type) – New Guinea
Asmea capella Gray & Smith, 2008 – New Guinea
Asmea hayllari Gray & Smith, 2008 – New Guinea
Asmea mullerensis Gray & Smith, 2008 – New Guinea

See also
 List of Stiphidiidae species

References

Araneomorphae genera
Spiders of Asia
Stiphidiidae